is a public holiday in Japan held annually on the second Monday of January. It is held in order to congratulate and encourage all those who have already reached the age of maturity between April 2 of the previous year and April 1 of the current year, and to help them realise that they have become adults. Festivities include  held at local and prefectural offices, as well as after-parties among family and friends.

Overview 
On June 13, 2018, the age of majority was lowered for the first time since it was established. According to the new law, which comes into force in 2022, a citizen is considered an adult with the onset of full 18 years.
Note that Coming of Age Day and the ceremony itself are not directly linked to changes in the legal status of young people. For example, adult status becomes effective on the 18th birthday, with some exceptions; both men and women can marry and are released from parental authority. At the same time, they are released from the various family and social restrictions imposed on minors. As adults, they become eligible for contracting on their own. As before, drinking and smoking are allowed at age 20, and the right to vote and to obtain a driver's license for passenger vehicles begins at age 18 (16 for motorcycles).

History
Coming of age ceremonies have been celebrated in Japan since at least 714 CE, during the reign of Empress Genmei when a young prince donned new robes and a hairstyle to mark his passage into adulthood. The holiday was first established in 1948, to be held every year on January 15. In 2000, as a result of the Happy Monday System, Coming of Age Day was changed to the second Monday in January.

Japan's low birth rate and shrinking percentage of young people, coupled with disruptions to some ceremonies in recent years (such as an incident in Naha in 2002, when drunken Japanese youths tried to disrupt the festivities) and a general increase in the number of 20-year-olds who do not feel themselves to be adults have led to decreased attendance of the ceremonies, which has caused some concern among older Japanese. In 2012, the decline continued for the fifth year in a row, with a total of 1.22 million adults celebrating the holiday in 2012 – under half of the participants seen at its peak in 1976, when 2.76 million adults attended ceremonies. This was the first time it has declined below the 50% threshold. Japan lowered the age of adulthood in 2018 from 20 years of age to 18 which is set to take effect in 2022. This change has caused confusion on the status of the holiday, and raised concerns among the kimono industry which profits from the garments worn during the ceremonies.

Ceremonies

 mark one's ending of coming of age (age of maturity), which reflects both the expanded rights but also increased responsibilities expected of new adults. The ceremonies are generally held in the morning at local city offices throughout Japan. All young adults who turned or will turn 18 between April 2 of the previous year and April 1 of the current one and who maintain residency in the area are invited to attend. Government officials give speeches, and small presents are handed out to the newly recognized adults.

Many women celebrate this day by wearing furisode, a style of kimono with long sleeves that hang down, and zōri sandals. Since most are unable to put on a kimono by themselves due to the intricacies involved, many choose to visit a beauty salon to dress and to set their hair. A full set of formal clothing is expensive, so it is usually either borrowed from a relative or rented rather than bought especially for the occasion. Men sometimes also wear traditional dress (e.g. dark kimono with hakama), but nowadays many men wear formal Western clothes such as a suit and tie more often than the traditional hakama. After the ceremony, the young adults often celebrate in groups by going to parties or going out drinking.

The ceremony often takes place in the city hall or school's gyms. There are some special cases such as the ceremony having been held at Tokyo Disneyland since 2002.

See also
 Genpuku
 Secular coming-of-age ceremony

References 

Festivals in Japan
January observances 
Society of Japan
Public holidays in Japan
Rites of passage
Holidays and observances by scheduling (nth weekday of the month)
Annual events in Japan
Articles containing video clips